Coursegoules is a commune in the Alpes-Maritimes department in southeastern France.  Its inhabitants are called the Coursegoulois.

Demographics

In 2019, the commune had 531 inhabitants.

Notable people 
 Numa Andoire (19 March 1908 – 2 January 1994), was a French football defender and a manager. He participated at the 1930 FIFA World Cup, but never gained any cups with the French football team.

Celebrity Links

The singer Camille, in her album Ilo Veyou (2012), dedicated her song Le Berger to Coursegoules.

See also
Communes of the Alpes-Maritimes department

References

External links

  Official site

Communes of Alpes-Maritimes